Yifat (more accurately romanized as "Yif'at") is a kibbutz in Galilee, northern Israel. Located adjacent to the town Migdal HaEmek and short distances from the cities of Afula and Nazareth. It falls under the jurisdiction of Jezreel Valley Regional Council.

History

The kibbutz was established in 1954 by members of Kvutzat HaSharon who previously lived in Ramat David, as well as former residents of Gevat, including Haim Gvati, later a government minister. It was initially named Ihud HaSharon - Gevat, but was later renamed after the biblical town of Yefia (Joshua 19:12), as does the name of the Arab town of Yafa an-Naseriyye.

Economy
The economy of Yifat is based on light industry, agriculture, greenhouses, plant nurseries, cattle, sheep, and chickens, as well as the hospitality industry. The sixth-grade school “Western Valley” and a performing arts complex are located within the kibbutz, as is the Pioneer Settlement Museum.

Yifat houses a Hebrew ulpan for immigrants and would-be immigrants. Furthermore, Jewish and Gentile “volunteers” from many countries have served on the kibbutz. In earlier days, Yifat welcomed non-Jews from Germany among its visitors when some kibbutzim discriminated even against those born after World War II.

See also
 Shlomo Shriki

References

External links
Official website 

Kibbutzim
Kibbutz Movement
Populated places established in 1954
Populated places in Northern District (Israel)
1954 establishments in Israel